Vatinius is a genus of assassin bugs (family Reduviidae), in the subfamily Harpactorinae.

Species
 Vatinius basilewskyi Villiers, 1962
 Vatinius desaegeri Schouteden, 1952
 Vatinius gouini Villiers, 1955
 Vatinius kivuensis Schouteden, 1952
 Vatinius ochropus (Stål, 1855)
 Vatinius overlaeti Schouteden, 1932
 Vatinius rhodesianus (Miller, 1950)
 Vatinius usambarensis Schouteden, 1932

References

Reduviidae
Cimicomorpha genera